Juan Miguel Jiménez López (born 20 May 1993), known as Juanmi , is a Spanish professional footballer who plays for La Liga club Real Betis as a forward.

He came through the youth ranks at Málaga, starting in its reserves and making his first-team debut in 2010, also spending time on loan at Racing de Santander in 2013. In La Liga, he also represented Real Sociedad and Betis, totalling over 200 games and 50 goals and winning the Copa del Rey in 2022. He spent one season in the Premier League with Southampton.

Juanmi won the European Championship with Spain under-19s in 2011 and 2012, and made his senior international debut in 2015.

Club career

Málaga
Juanmi was born in Coín, Province of Málaga. Raised in Málaga CF's youth academy, he made his first-team debut on 13 January 2010 in a Copa del Rey away match against Getafe CF, scoring as the Andalusians were crushed 5–1 (losing 6–3 on aggregate), which made him the club's youngest ever goalscorer in an official game at the age of only 16. Four days later, he first appeared in La Liga, playing eight minutes in a 1–0 home win over the same opponent.

On 27 March 2010, Juanmi assisted Apoño's goal in a 1–1 home draw against CD Tenerife. Although Málaga were threatened with relegation until the last day of the season, he still was able to make five first-team appearances, totalling 110 minutes. He signed his first professional contract on 5 August, keeping him with the club until the end of 2014–15.

On 12 September 2010, 17-year-old Juanmi started at Real Zaragoza, scoring twice as Málaga led 5–0 at the 30-minute mark (eventually winning 5–3). By doing this, he became the youngest player in the competition's history to achieve this feat in only one game.

After the summer of 2011 signing of Ruud van Nistelrooy, Juanmi was further demoted down Málaga's attacking pecking order. He made his first appearance of the season on 11 December 2011, coming on as a substitute and scoring in a 1–1 home draw with CA Osasuna. He started at Getafe for the Spanish Cup two days later, and scored the game's only goal in the 84th minute.

On 15 January 2013, after featuring even more rarely, Juanmi was loaned to Segunda División's Racing de Santander until June. He failed to find the net during his short spell, and his team also suffered relegation.

Juanmi was given more playing time by new Málaga manager Bernd Schuster in 2013–14, and was made a starter by Javi Gracia in the following campaign. On 31 January 2015 he was definitely promoted to the main squad, being handed the number 11 jersey.

Southampton
On 16 June 2015, Juanmi signed a four-year deal with Premier League side Southampton, for an undisclosed fee reported to be £5 million. He made his debut on 30 July, coming on for Jordy Clasie in the 62nd minute and setting up fellow substitute Shane Long for the final goal in a 3–0 victory over Vitesse Arnhem at St. Mary's Stadium in the third qualifying round of the UEFA Europa League.

Real Sociedad
On 9 June 2016, after 19 goalless appearances in all competitions – two starts – Juanmi returned to his home country and joined Real Sociedad for an undisclosed fee. He made his competitive debut on 21 August, starting as they began the season with a 3–0 home loss to Real Madrid. Six days later, he scored his first goal to open a 2–0 win at Osasuna.

Juanmi was given a yellow card on 28 February 2017 for celebrating the opening goal of a 2–2 draw with SD Eibar at Anoeta Stadium by lifting up his shirt to show a tribute to the recently deceased leukemia sufferer Pablo Ráez, and was sent off in the second half for a second booking.

Betis

On 14 June 2019, Juanmi signed a five-year contract with Real Betis for a €8 million fee. He spent the vast majority of his debut campaign on the sidelines, nursing a left-foot injury.

Juanmi scored his first competitive goal on 28 June 2020, but in a 4–2 away defeat against Levante UD. On 28 November 2021, against the same opposition but at home, his second-half hat-trick proved crucial to the 3–1 victory. He played in the team's cup final win over Valencia five months later, having scored twice away to his previous club in a 4–0 quarter-final win on 3 February. He concluded the 2021–22 season with a career-best 20 goals in all competitions, of which 16 in the league, where he was joint fifth top scorer.

International career
Juanmi won two consecutive UEFA European Under-19 Championships, scoring two goals in the 2011 edition in Romania. On 23 March 2015, he was called up to the senior Spain national team for the first time by coach Vicente del Bosque, ahead of a UEFA Euro 2016 qualifier against Ukraine and a friendly with the Netherlands, after Diego Costa withdrew with a hamstring injury. He made his debut in the latter game at the Amsterdam Arena on 31 March, starting and making way for Álvaro Morata in a 2–0 defeat.

On 29 December 2016, Juanmi played for the Andalusian representative side in a 3–1 home win over a La Liga XI, to raise money for UNICEF.

Career statistics

Club

International

Honours
Betis
Copa del Rey: 2021–22

Spain U19
UEFA European Under-19 Championship: 2011, 2012

Individual
LaLiga Player of the Month: December 2021

References

External links

Betis official profile

1993 births
Living people
Sportspeople from the Province of Málaga
Spanish footballers
Footballers from Andalusia
Association football forwards
La Liga players
Segunda División players
Tercera División players
Atlético Malagueño players
Málaga CF players
Racing de Santander players
Real Sociedad footballers
Real Betis players
Premier League players
Southampton F.C. players
Spain youth international footballers
Spain international footballers
Spanish expatriate footballers
Expatriate footballers in England
Spanish expatriate sportspeople in England